Jack Reed may refer to:

People
Jack Reed (baseball) (1933–2022), American baseball player
John Reed (journalist) (1887–1920), American journalist, poet, and communist activist
Jack Reed (Mississippi politician) (1924–2016), American businessman and Republican gubernatorial candidate
Jack Reed (Rhode Island politician) (born 1949), U.S. senator from Rhode Island
Jack Reed (rugby league) (born 1988), English rugby league footballer
Jack Carlton Reed (1930–2009), drug smuggler

Others
Jack Reed (series), a series of television movies starring Brian Dennehy

See also
John Reed (disambiguation)
Jack Reid (footballer), Irish international footballer
Jack Reid (1924/5–2009), Canadian artist
Jackie Reid, fictional character in the ITV series Taggart

Reed, Jack